Darin Beckstead is an American filmmaker who has directed films, including Courage & Stupidity and Somebody's Hero.

Career
In 2005, his debut film, Courage & Stupidity, was released. Steven Spielberg's experiences making Jaws were reinterpreted in his film Courage & Stupidity. The film was shown at Fantasia and the Sitges Film Festival. The film was distributed by Netflix.

In 2012, Beckstead directed Somebody's Hero. The film was shown at Heartland Film Festival and Newport Beach Film Festival. At the Coney Island Film Festival, the film received the Best Feature Award.

Filmography
 Courage & Stupidity (2005)
 Somebody's Hero (2012)
 Galactic Heat (2015) 
 Evil Nature (2018)

Awards and recognition
 2005: Fantasia Film Festival Award for Courage & Stupidity
 2005: Sitges Film Festival Award for Courage & Stupidity
 2011: Coney Island Film Festival Award for Somebody's Hero
 2018: Malibu Film Festival Award for Evil Nature

References

American filmmakers
Year of birth missing (living people)
Living people